The National Orgasm Day is a celebration that celebrates sexual climax and raises awareness for issues surrounding sexual climax. It is typically celebrated on July 31 in places such as the United Kingdom, Australia, United States, the Netherlands,  Canada and even South Africa. National Orgasm Day is an off-shoot of International Female Orgasm Day (August 8).

International Female Orgasm Day 
International Female Orgasm Day was first celebrated on August 5th, 2007 in Esperantina, Brazil. It was created by the Councilman Arimateio Dantas when he passed a municipal law establishing the holiday in order to raise awareness for female sexuality and reduce stigma and taboo surrounding it, as well as repaying a "sexual debt" to his wife. In addition to the holiday, several events were held in the town for the discussion of these usually taboo topics, with support from local and international communities and the local church.

Celebrations 
Participants often celebrate National Orgasm Day by: 

 Orgasming,
 Masturbation,
 Raising awareness for what orgasms are and how to have one (especially aimed toward women due to social stigma surrounding the female orgasm),
 Raising awareness for the health benefits of orgasms,
 Raising awareness for the "orgasm gap",
 Spreading discussion surrounding the practice of faking an orgasm,

References

July observances
Orgasm